Ivisan, officially the Municipality of Ivisan (Capiznon/Hiligaynon: Banwa sang Ivisan), is a 4th class municipality in the province of Capiz, Philippines. According to the 2020 census, it has a population of 31,278 people.

The current mayor is Jose Noel N. Yap who won in the 2007 elections. He is the brother of former Ivisan mayor Felipe Neri Yap and the son of former mayor Amelia Yap who only finished two terms as mayor.

Geography

Barangays
Ivisan is politically subdivided into 15 barangays.
 Agmalobo
 Agustin Navarra (Agumang - ang)
 Balaring
 Basiao
 Cabugao
 Cudian
 Ilaya-Ivisan (Yabton)
 Malocloc Norte
 Malocloc Sur (Mahayag)
 Matnog
 Mianay
 Ondoy
 Poblacion Norte
 Poblacion Sur
 Santa Cruz

Climate

Demographics

Economy

References

External links

 [ Philippine Standard Geographic Code]
Philippine Census Information

Municipalities of Capiz